Cyanika is a populated settlement in Rwanda. It sits adjacent to Kyanika, across the international border with neighboring Uganda. Cyanika, also refers to Cyanika Sector, one of the 17 administrative divisions of Burera District.

Location
The geographical coordinates of Cyanika, Burera District, Rwanda are:
1°20'40.0"S, 29°44'32.0"E (Latitude:-1.344444; Longitude:29.742222).

Overview
Cyanika/Kyanika is one of the three major road crossings between Rwanda to the south and Uganda to the north. The other to are Gatuna/Katuna and Kagitumba/Mirama Hills.

In February 2019, Rwanda closed its borders to Ugandans and Ugandan goods, including at the Chanika/Kyanika border crossing. As a result, the annual trade worth approximately US$180 million to Uganda and about US$10 million to Rwanda came to a halt. As of February 2020, attempts by the presidents of Angola, João Lourenço and of the Democratic Republic of the Congo, Félix Tshisekedi, have not yet resolved the impasse.

Points of interest
The border crossing is in close proximity to Volcanoes National Park in Rwanda, Mgahinga Gorilla National Park in Uganda, and Virunga National Park, in the Democratic Republic of the Congo.

References

External links
Official website of Volcanoes National Park
How the Rwanda-Uganda border crossing came to a halt As of 9 March 2019.

Burera District
Northern Province, Rwanda
Populated places in Rwanda
Rwanda–Uganda border crossings